Bomberg is a surname, borne, among others by 

 Daniel Bomberg (?, Antwerp – 1549), printer of the Talmud
 David Garshen Bomberg (1890–1957), English painter of Polish Jewish origin
 David Bomberg House, a hall of residence for London South Bank University students

Ashkenazi surnames
Germanic-language surnames
Bamberg

de:Bomberg